Asyncorynidae is a family of cnidarians belonging to the order Anthoathecata.

Genera:
 Asyncoryne Warren, 1908

References

Capitata
Cnidarian families